Dairy Creek is a  tributary of the Tualatin River in the U.S. state of Oregon. It begins at the confluence of its east and west forks near the unincorporated community of Schefflin and meanders southeast across the Tualatin Valley to the Tualatin River near Hillsboro, in Washington County. Before railroads displaced river boats on the Tualatin, some steamships also worked the lower section of Dairy Creek, with plans to go as far up stream as Centerville.

Course

Main stem
Flowing southeast, it receives Council Creek from the right  from the mouth and McKay Creek from the left less than  later.

West Fork
For roughly its first , West Fork Dairy Creek flows south from near Tophill in northwestern Washington County. It passes under Oregon Route 47 twice, receives Cummings Creek from the right and Williams Creek from the left, and passes slightly west of Buxton  from the main stem. Shortly thereafter, it crosses under U.S. Route 26 (Sunset Highway) and turns southeast. Running parallel to and south of 
Flowing parallel to and north of the highway for about another , West Fork Dairy Creek receives Whitcher Creek from the left, Kuder Creek from the right, and Garrigus Creek from the left before flowing south under Route 26 for the third and last time  from the confluence of the east and west forks.

The west fork passes under Route 47, no longer concurrent with Route 26,  from the confluence. Shortly thereafter, the stream flows by Banks, which lies to its left.

East Fork
From its headwaters, East Fork Dairy Creek flows south for less than  through Columbia County before entering Washington County  from its confluence with the west fork. Over its next , it receives Campbell Creek and Roundy Creek, both from the right, Panther Creek and Rock Creek, both from the left, Denny Creek from the right, Plentywater Creek and Meadow Brook Creek, both from the left, and Murtaugh Creek and Big Canyon, both from the right. At  from the confluence, the stream passes United States Geological Survey (USGS) gauge 14205400. East Fork Dairy Creek flows under U.S. Route 26 about  later.

Discharge

See also
List of rivers of Oregon

References

External links

Dairy - McKay Watershed Analysis - Tualatin River Watershed Council

Tualatin River
Rivers of Oregon
Rivers of Washington County, Oregon